Frank Weir was a musician.

Frank Weir may also refer to:

Frank Weir (cricketer)
Frank D. Weir, American horse trainer